Tharu cinema refers to films produced in the Tharu language in the Terai or Madhesh region of southern Nepal and Uttar Pradesh, India.

The first Tharu talkie film, Karam, was released in around 1988. Tharu cinema has grown in recent years. Tharu movies are seen across various parts of Asia where second and third generation migrants still speak the language

Cinema of Nepal